5.45×18mm MPTs (7N7) is a Soviet pistol cartridge.
It is chambered in the PSM pistol, OTs-23 Drotik machine pistol and OTs-26 pistol.

History and design
It was designed in the Soviet Union in the early 1970s by   Antonina D. Denisova at the Precision Mechanical Engineering Central Research Institute (TsNIITochmash). The development was done in concert with that of the PSM.

The cartridge is designed to use light spitzer-pointed jacketed bullets.

Variants 
 5.45×18mm 7N7 (7Н7): spitzer-pointed full metal jacket bullet with steel conical core. The bullet energy is stated to be up to 1.5 times that of .25 ACP in a similar sized cartridge. It is stated to be capable of penetrating 45 layers of Kevlar soft body armor at close distances.
 5.45×18mm PSO (ПСО): spitzer-pointed full metal jacket bullet with lead core.
 5.45×18mm 7H8 (холостой патрон 7Х8): blank cartridge

References

External links
 Barnes, Frank C., ed. by John T. Amber. Cartridges of the World. Northfield: DBI Books, 1972.
 Cutshaw, Charlie. The New World of Russian Small Arms & Ammo. Boulder: Paladin Press, 1998.
 Fortier, David M. "Military Ammo Today". Handguns. November 2008.

5.45×18mm firearms
Pistol and rifle cartridges
Military cartridges